Chorus may refer to:

Music
 Chorus (song) or refrain,  line or lines that are repeated in music or in verse
 Chorus effect, the perception of similar sounds from multiple sources as a single, richer sound
 Chorus form, song in which all verses or stanzas are sung to the same music
 Choir, a vocal ensemble
 Chorus (Eberhard Weber album), a 1985 album by jazz composer Eberhard Weber
 Chorus (Erasure album), a 1991 album by English musical duo Erasure
 "Chorus" (Erasure song), a 1991 single from the album
 Chorus (Flying Saucer Attack album), an album by the band Flying Saucer Attack
 Chorus UK, a community choir in Sheffield, UK

Other entertainment
 Greek chorus, a group of performers in the plays of classical Greece who comment on the dramatic action
 Chorus (musical theatre), non-principal performers in musical theatre
 Chorus (magazine), a Japanese manga magazine
 Chorus (1974 film), a film directed by Mrinal Sen
 The Chorus (1982 film), a 1982 Iranian short film directed by Abbas Kiarostami
 The Chorus (2004 film), the US title for the movie Les Choristes
 The Chorus (soundtrack), the original soundtrack of the 2004 film
 Chorus (2015 film)
 Les Choristes, an 1887 Edgar Degas pastel sometimes referred to as "The Chorus".
 Chorus (video game), a 2021 space combat game

Companies and products
 Chorus Communications, a telecommunications company in Ireland
 Chorus Limited, a telecommunications company in New Zealand
 Chorus Motors, a subsidiary of Borealis Exploration
 Chorus Systèmes SA, a computer software company in France
 Campagnolo, a company that makes a racing bicycle groupset called "Chorus"
 Hyundai Chorus, a minibus
 Tecplot Chorus, a simulation analytics tool for engineers

Other uses
 Chorus (architecture),  the area of a church or cathedral that provides seating for the clergy and choir
 Chorus (gastropod), a genus of sea snails
 Chorus (horse), damsire of British Thoroughbred racehorse Chorister (horse)
 ChorusOS, an operating system for embedded systems

See also

 Chorus Girl (disambiguation)
 Dawn chorus (disambiguation)
 Choir (disambiguation)
 
 
 Choru, Kohgiluyeh and Boyer-Ahmad, Iran
 Corus (disambiguation)
 Korus (disambiguation)